The Scholastic Asian Book Award (SABA) is the joint initiative of Scholastic Asia and the Singapore Book Council (SBC). The award recognizes children's writers of Asian origin who are taking the experiences of life, spirit, and thinking in different parts of Asia to the world at large. The award also aims to promote the understanding of the Asian experience and its expression in innovative and creative forms. The awards are announced at the Asian Festival of Children's Content in Singapore.

Objectives 

 To recognise excellence in fiction in Asian stories for children
 To showcase the diversity of literary talent within Asia
 To encourage and inspire more books and stories with Asian content

Winners

2018 

 Winner: Wing of the Locust, by Joel Donato Jacob (Philippines)
 2nd: Red Eyes, by Varsha Seshan (India)
 3rd: Blue2, by Yuet Lan Dora Tsang (Hong Kong)

2016

 Winner: Codex: The Lost Treasure of the Indus, by Aditi Krishnakumar (India)
 2nd: Chasing Freedom, by Tina Cho (South Korea)
 3rd: Island Girl, by Ho Lee Ling (Singapore)

2014

 Winner: What Things Mean, by  Sophia N. Lee (Philippines)
 2nd: Sula’s Voyage, by Catherine Torres (Philippines)
 3rd: Robin and the Case of the Summer Camp Kidnapping, by Vivek Bhanot (India)

2012 

 Winner: Bungee Cord Hair, by Ching Yeung Russell (USA)
 2nd: Not in the Stars, by Pauline Loh Tuan Lee (Singapore)
 3rd: Hidden in Plain Sight, by Ang Su-Lin (Singapore)

2011 

 Winner: Book Uncle and Me, by Uma Krishnaswarmi (India)
 2nd: The Girl Mechanic of Wanzhou, by Marjorie Sayer (USA)
 3rd: The Mudskipper, by Ovidia Yu (Singapore)

See also 

 Scholastic Picture Book Award

References

External links 

 The Scholastic Asian Book Award website

Children's literary awards
Children's books
Asian literary awards